A charting application is a computer program that is used to create a graphical representation (a chart) based on some non-graphical data that is entered by a user, most often through a spreadsheet application, but also through a dedicated specific scientific application (such as through a symbolic mathematics computing system, or a proprietary data collection application), or using an online spreadsheet service.

There are several online charting services available, the most popular one being the U.S. Department of Education's Institute of Education Sciences' NCES Chart.

See also
List of information graphics software

Charts